Western Reserve may refer to:

The Connecticut Western Reserve, now northeastern Ohio, U.S.
Western Reserve Academy, Hudson, Ohio, founded 1826
Western Reserve Eclectic Institute, now Hiram College, Hiram, Ohio, founded 1850
Western Reserve Historical Society
Western Reserve High School (Berlin Center, Ohio)
Western Reserve High School (Collins, Ohio)
Western Reserve Public Media and Western Reserve PBS, branding of public television stations WEAO-TV and WNEO-TV
Western Reserve Land Conservancy, a nonprofit land trust in Northeast Ohio
Case Western Reserve University, Cleveland, Ohio. Founded in 1826 as Western Reserve College and later named Western Reserve University; merged with Case Institute of Technology in 1967
SS Western Reserve, a ghost ship lost on Lake Superior in 1892
Western Reserve Hospital, a local hospital in Cuyahoga Falls, Ohio, founded 1943.
The Manitoba West Reserve or Western Reserve in South Central Manitoba, Canada, immediately north of the American border, that was settled by Russian Mennonites beginning in 1875